The Six Fat Dutchmen was an American polka band, formed around 1932 by Harold Loeffelmacher in New Ulm, Minnesota, United States. The band was known mostly for playing the "Oom-pah" style of polka music that originated from Germany and the German-speaking areas of Czechoslovakia.  They were regular performers at the then-famous George's Ballroom in New Ulm, and were voted Number One Polka Band for seven years in a row by the National Ballroom Operators Association. Compilations of their music continue to be produced and sold, more than 70 years after the band's founding.

Like Bill Monroe's Bluegrass Boys, the band provided the name to its musical genre, "Dutchman Music". As might be surmised from the band's name, there were initially six members, but over time it grew to include about a dozen musicians.  The band appeared often on a local television station in Mankato, Minnesota, and their popularity grew to the point where they played the Nebraska State Fair for 26 straight years.  The Six Fat Dutchmen played the Aragon and Trianon ballrooms in Chicago, broadcasting live on radio station WGN.    

They enjoyed a 14-year recording career with RCA Victor, during which they recorded 800 songs.  After parting ways with RCA, the band recorded for Dot Records for ten years.

The 1995 compilation CD The Six Fat Dutchmen's Greatest Hits earned a 3.5 star rating (out of 5) in AllMusic.  Another compilation, Greatest Hits Volume 2 was released in 2006.

Some of their vintage television appearances have made their way to the popular YouTube website. Singer and saxophone player Dick Dale was briefly a member of the Six Fat Dutchmen, before he became a regular on the long-running American television variety series, The Lawrence Welk Show.

In 1990, three years after the death of Harold Loeffelmacher, he and his Six Fat Dutchmen were inducted into the Minnesota Music Hall of Fame.

Partial discography
6 Fat Dutchmen  (RCA Victor LSP-1769) 1958
Schottisches (1959)
Polka Parade! (Hamilton Records, HLP 121) 1964
On Tour  (Dot DLP 25734) 1960s
Polkas: Greatest Hits!  (Dot DLP 25358)  1961
Polka's No. 1 Band  (Polka City PC-402)  1970s
Ten Fat Hits!  (Pickwick SPC-3083) 1970s
Greatest Hits (Ross) 1995
Greatest Hits (Polka City PC-6656) 2002
Greatest Hits Vol. 2 (Polka City PC-1028) 2006

References

External links
 International Polka Association page for Harold Loeffelmacher

American polka groups
German-American history
Dot Records artists
RCA Victor artists